Tjilpa is the name given to a marsupial cat amongst the Arrernte language group of Australian Aboriginal people. There are many Dreamtime stories of tribes of ancestral Tjilpa-men, who had a significant mythological role. The geographical range of these stories includes Aranda, Anmatyerre, Kaytetye, Ngalia, Ilpara and Kukatja lands.

References 

Australian Aboriginal mythology
Arrernte